Elliott Macklovitch is a Canadian linguist specializing in machine translation.

From 1999 to 2009, Macklovitch was the Coordinator of the RALI Laboratory (Recherche Appliquée en Linguistique Informatique) at the Université de Montréal. He served as President of the Association for Machine Translation in the Americas (AMTA) from 2000 to 2004. Since 2010, he has worked as an independent consultant in machine translation for clients in the private and public sectors.

References

External links
 www.chin.gc.ca
 Elliot Macklovitch home page

Year of birth missing (living people)
Living people
Linguists from Canada
Academic staff of the Université de Montréal